G.O.Y.A. (Gunz Or Yay Available) is the third studio album by American rapper Termanology, released on October 8, 2013, through his own record label, ST. Records, Statik Selektah's Showoff Records, and Boston based label Brick Records.

Background
The album includes guest appearances from Action Bronson, Chris Rivers, Dice Raw, DJ Kay Slay, DJ Premier, Doo Wop, Ea$y Money, H Blanco, Inspectah Deck, Juju, Lee Wilson, Lil Fame, Maffew Ragazino, N.O.R.E., Reks, Sheek Louch, Sway Calloway, Tony Touch and Wais P. The album is mostly produced by Shortfyuz.

Singles
On July 25, 2013, the first single from the album, "Straight Off The Block" featuring DJ Kay Slay, Sheek Louch & Lil Fame, was released. The official music video for the single was released on October 11, 2013.
On August 22, 2013, he released the second single "100 More Jewelz".
On September 10, 2013, he released the third single "Judo" featuring N.O.R.E. The official music video for the single was released on September 18, 2013.
On September 26, 2013, he released the fourth single "You Ain't Safe". On October 8, 2013, he released the fifth and final single "Take My Turn".

Track listing
All tracks produced by Shortfyuz except tracks 3 & 13, co-produced by DJ Deadeye and The Arcitype.

References

Termanology albums